The North Florida Ospreys women's basketball team represent the University of North Florida (UNF) in women's college basketball. The Ospreys compete in the ASUN Conference (A-Sun) in Division I of the National Collegiate Athletic Association (NCAA).

History
North Florida began play in 1992. As of the end of the 2015–16 season, the Ospreys have an all-time record of 319–373. They have never made the Division I Tournament, but they made the Division II Tournament in 2003 and 2004. They played in the Peach Belt Conference (Division II) from 1997 to 2005. From its inception until 2015, Mary Tappmeyer coached the team until her contract was not renewed, and she sued the school for sex-discrimination and citing retaliation for complaints. The two parties settled for $1.25 million.

Postseason

NCAA Division II tournament results
The Ospreys made two appearances in the NCAA Division II women's basketball tournament. They had a combined record of 3–2.

References

External links